Kardašova Řečice is a town in Jindřichův Hradec District in the South Bohemian Region of the Czech Republic. It has about 2,200 inhabitants.

Administrative parts
Villages of Mnich and Nítovice are administrative parts of Kardašova Řečice.

Geography
It lies in the Třeboň Basin, the southern part of the municipal territory lies also in the Třeboňsko Protected Landscape Area. The territory is rich in small streams and in fish ponds.

History
The first written mention of Kardašova Řečice is from 1267.

Sights
The landmark of the town is the Church of Saint John the Baptist. It was an early Gothic church from the mid-13th century, rebuilt in 1380. In 1615–1620, the tower was finished. The reconstruction to its present form took place in 1814.

The Kardašova Řečice Castle is a baroque building from the 1720s. Since 1989, it has been owned by the Congregation of the School Sisters of Notre Dame, which established a retirement home there. The castle includes an English park. Both the castle and the park are not accessible to the public.

Notable people
Boleslav Jablonský (1813–1881), Catholic priest and poet

Twin towns – sister cities

Kardašova Řečice is twinned with:
 Oberdiessbach, Switzerland

References

External links

Cities and towns in the Czech Republic
Populated places in Jindřichův Hradec District